The women's 58 kilograms event at the 2015 World Weightlifting Championships were held on 22 and 23 November 2015 in Houston, United States.

Schedule

Medalists

Records

Results

New records

References

Results 

2015 World Weightlifting Championships
World